The Peter Herdic House is a historic home located at 407 West 4th Street between Elmira and Center Streets in the Millionaire's Row Historic District of Williamsport, Pennsylvania, United States. It was built in 1855–1856, and is a -story, brick building, coated in stucco in the Italian Villa style.  It features three bay windows on each floor and a distinctive cupola atop the roof. Peter Herdic was a notable figure in the early development of Williamsport, and served as its fourth mayor, beginning in the fall of 1869.

The house was added to the National Register of Historic Places in 1978.  The Millionaire's Row Historic District was listed in 1985.

See also

National Register of Historic Places listings in Lycoming County, Pennsylvania

References

External links

Buildings and structures in Williamsport, Pennsylvania
Houses on the National Register of Historic Places in Pennsylvania
Italianate architecture in Pennsylvania
Houses completed in 1856
Houses in Lycoming County, Pennsylvania
National Register of Historic Places in Lycoming County, Pennsylvania